Wygoda or variation, may refer to:

Places

Poland
Wygoda, Aleksandrów County in Kuyavian-Pomeranian Voivodeship (north-central Poland)
Wygoda, Toruń County in Kuyavian-Pomeranian Voivodeship (north-central Poland)
Wygoda, Gmina Janów Podlaski in Lublin Voivodeship (east Poland)
Wygoda, Gmina Wisznice in Lublin Voivodeship (east Poland)
Wygoda, Chełm County in Lublin Voivodeship (east Poland)
Wygoda, Hajnówka County in Podlaskie Voivodeship (north-east Poland)
Wygoda, Łomża County in Podlaskie Voivodeship (north-east Poland)
Wygoda, Łowicz County in Łódź Voivodeship (central Poland)
Wygoda, Łódź East County in Łódź Voivodeship (central Poland)
Wygoda, Piotrków County in Łódź Voivodeship (central Poland)
Wygoda, Radomsko County in Łódź Voivodeship (central Poland)
Wygoda, Tomaszów Mazowiecki County in Łódź Voivodeship (central Poland)
Wygoda, Wieluń County in Łódź Voivodeship (central Poland)
Wygoda, Puławy County in Lublin Voivodeship (east Poland)
Wygoda, Gmina Jędrzejów in Świętokrzyskie Voivodeship (south-central Poland)
Wygoda, Gmina Imielno in Świętokrzyskie Voivodeship (south-central Poland)
Wygoda, Sandomierz County in Świętokrzyskie Voivodeship (south-central Poland)
Wygoda, Garwolin County in Masovian Voivodeship (east-central Poland)
Wygoda, Lipsko County in Masovian Voivodeship (east-central Poland)
Wygoda, Łosice County in Masovian Voivodeship (east-central Poland)
Wygoda, Otwock County in Masovian Voivodeship (east-central Poland)
Wygoda, Przasnysz County in Masovian Voivodeship (east-central Poland)
Wygoda, Zwoleń County in Masovian Voivodeship (east-central Poland)
Wygoda, Żuromin County in Masovian Voivodeship (east-central Poland)
Wygoda, Żyrardów County in Masovian Voivodeship (east-central Poland)
Wygoda, Gostyń County in Greater Poland Voivodeship (west-central Poland)
Wygoda, Kalisz County in Greater Poland Voivodeship (west-central Poland)
Wygoda, Gmina Kazimierz Biskupi in Greater Poland Voivodeship (west-central Poland)
Wygoda, Gmina Ślesin in Greater Poland Voivodeship (west-central Poland)
Wygoda, Krotoszyn County in Greater Poland Voivodeship (west-central Poland)
Wygoda, Leszno County in Greater Poland Voivodeship (west-central Poland)
Wygoda, Poznań County in Greater Poland Voivodeship (west-central Poland)
Wygoda, Silesian Voivodeship (south Poland)
Wygoda, Opole Voivodeship (south-west Poland)
Wygoda, Gmina Lipnica in Pomeranian Voivodeship (north Poland)
Wygoda, Gmina Parchowo in Pomeranian Voivodeship (north Poland)
Wygoda, Kościerzyna County in Pomeranian Voivodeship (north Poland)
Wygoda, Wejherowo County in Pomeranian Voivodeship (north Poland)
Wygoda, Kętrzyn County in Warmian-Masurian Voivodeship (north Poland)
Wygoda, Olsztyn County in Warmian-Masurian Voivodeship (north Poland)
Wygoda, Ostróda County in Warmian-Masurian Voivodeship (north Poland)
Wygoda, West Pomeranian Voivodeship (north-west Poland)
Osiedle Wygoda, Białystok, a district of Białystok

Other places
Vyhoda, Kalush Raion, Ivano-Frankivsk Oblast (Ukraine)

See also

 
Vigoda (surname)
Abe Vigoda (band)